1990 Soviet Lower Second League was the second season of the Soviet Second League B since its reestablishing in 1990. As in the last season it was divided into 10 zones (groups).

Final standings

I Zone (Ukraine)

II Zone (Armenia)

III Zone (Azerbaijan)

IV Zone (South Russia)

V Zone (Center)

VI Zone (North Russia and Moscow)

VII Zone (Volga/Ural)

VIII Zone (Kazakhstan)

IX Zone (Central Asia)

X Zone (Russia Far East)

See also
 Soviet Second League B

External links
 1990 Soviet Championship and Cup
 1990 season at rsssf.com

Soviet Second League B seasons
4
Soviet
Soviet
1990 in Russian football
1990 in Armenian football
1990 in Belarusian football
1990 in Kazakhstani football
1990 in Kyrgyzstani football
1990 in Latvian football
1990 in Tajikistani football
1990 in Turkmenistani sport
1990 in Ukrainian association football leagues
1990 in Uzbekistani football
2 
2
2 
2